Chellampatti is a village of usilampatti taluk, Madurai district, Tamil Nadu, India. The village is located on National Highway 85.Chellampatti it's famous for its panchayat.

Governance
Chellampatti is well known for it panchayat system. The Kallars had a unique character of ruling themselves with unwritten laws and regulations from time immemorial.

Chellampatti panchayat has five leadrs: Parusa Pulli Thevar-I, Parusa Pulli Thevar-II, Nallu Thevar, Poosari Thevar and Kasalagara Thevar.

References

External links
 

Villages in Madurai district